Chichekli is a village and municipality in the Sabirabad District of Azerbaijan. It has a population of 1,424.

References

Populated places in Sabirabad District